Dual Alliance may refer to:

The Dual Alliance (1879) between Germany and Austria-Hungary
The Franco-Russian Alliance or Dual Alliance of 1894, between France and Tsarist Russia

See also

Triple Alliance (disambiguation)